Renate Holmes (born 30 August 1929) is a British alpine skier. She competed at the 1956 Winter Olympics and the 1960 Winter Olympics.

Holmes worked as a secretary at the British Consulate in Frankfurt. She married an RAF officer before moving to Ottawa, Canada.

References

External links

1929 births
Possibly living people
British female alpine skiers
Olympic alpine skiers of Great Britain
Alpine skiers at the 1956 Winter Olympics
Alpine skiers at the 1960 Winter Olympics
Place of birth missing (living people)